The 1998–99 Wichita Thunder season was the seventh season of the CHL franchise in Wichita, Kansas.

Regular season

Division standings

See also
1998–99 CHL season

External links
1998–99 Wichita Thunder season at Hockey Database

Wichita Thunder seasons
Wich